Juan Martino (born 1887, date of death unknown) was an Argentine sports shooter. He competed in the 50 m rifle event at the 1924 Summer Olympics.

References

External links
 

1887 births
Year of death missing
Argentine male sport shooters
Olympic shooters of Argentina
Shooters at the 1924 Summer Olympics
Place of birth missing
Pan American Games medalists in shooting
Pan American Games gold medalists for Argentina
Shooters at the 1951 Pan American Games
Medalists at the 1951 Pan American Games